Kirov Oblast is a federal subject of Russia (an oblast) located in Eastern Europe. Its administrative center is the city of Kirov. Population: 1,341,312 (2010 Census).

Geography

Natural resources
The basis of the natural resources are forest (mostly conifers), phosphate rock, peat, furs, water and land resources. There are widespread deposits of peat and non-metallic minerals: limestone, marl, clay, sand and gravel, as well as the extremely rare mineral volkonskoite. In recent decades, in the east of the area revealed a minor recoverable oil reserves and deposits of bentonite clays. In the area is the largest in Europe Vyatsko-Kama deposit of phosphate rock. The area is rich in mineral springs and therapeutic mud. On the territory of Kumyonsky District is famous resort town of federal significance Nizhneivkino, which on treatment and rest come to residents of the Kirov region and many regions of Russia.

Hydrography
The region has a total length of 19753 River 66.65 kilometers. Northern Uvaly two separate river basins – the Severodvinsk and the Volga. Much of the area is occupied by the Vyatka River basin, a tributary of the Kama River in Tatarstan. At Kama is only in the upper reaches. To large flowing within the area are also river mole and Tansy, Luza, Cobra, Cheptsa.

The total number of lakes in the area of 4.5 thousand ponds With the total number of closed water area of 5.5 million. The largest lakes are: Akshuben – 85 hectares, the Oryol – 63 hectares, Muserskoe – 32 hectares. The deepest area of the pond Lezhninskoe Lake – 36.6 m.

History
Kirov Krai was established on December 7, 1934. It was transformed into Kirov Oblast on December 5, 1936 upon the adoption of the 1936 Soviet Constitution. On 30 October 1997, Kirov, alongside Astrakhan, Murmansk, Ulyanovsk, and Yaroslavl, signed a power-sharing agreement with the government of Russia, granting it autonomy. The agreement would be abolished on 24 January 2002.

Administrative divisions

Kirov Oblast was formed on December 7, 1934. It is divided administratively into 39 districts, 6 cities under oblast jurisdiction, 13 town under district jurisdiction, 58 urban-type settlements, and 580 selsoviets.

Economy

Kirov Oblast is part of the Volga–Vyatka economic district located in the central part of European Russia in the Volga and Vyatka river basins. Its economic complex had already begun forming and developing before the Revolution, in large part because of the transfer points and trading posts located in Vyatka, which later led to the formation of large trading centers. Agriculture was the priority sector at first, but starting in 1940, there was an upsurge in development of an industrial complex, especially the engineering, metalworking, and chemical industries.

Kirov Oblast is part of the Volga–Vyatka agricultural zone, where more than half of the area sown in grain is located in Kirov Oblast itself. Agricultural land occupies 27% of the region's territory. The most important grain crops are winter and spring wheat and rye. Barley and oats are grown for fodder. Increased specialization in the production of more promising fodder crops like winter rye, barley, oats that are most suited to the Oblast's climatic conditions is anticipated in the future. Potatoes are also extensively cultivated.

Transportation
The Dymnoye peat railway operates in Verkhnekamsky District
The Gorokhovskoye peat railway operates in Kotelnichsky District
The Otvorskoye peat railway operates in Kotelnichsky District
The Pishchalskoye peat railway operates in Orichevsky District
The Kobrinskaya narrow-gauge railway for hauling felled logs operates in Murashinsky District
The Oparinskaya narrow-gauge railway for hauling felled logs operates in Oparinsky District

Politics
During the Soviet period, the high authority in the oblast was shared between three persons: The first secretary of the Kirov CPSU Committee (who in reality had the biggest authority), the chairman of the oblast Soviet (legislative power), and the Chairman of the oblast Executive Committee (executive power). Since 1991, CPSU lost all the power, and the head of the Oblast administration, and eventually the governor was appointed/elected alongside elected regional parliament.

The Charter of Kirov Oblast is the fundamental law of the region. The Legislative Assembly of Kirov Oblast is the province's standing legislative (representative) body. The Legislative Assembly exercises its authority by passing laws, resolutions, and other legal acts and by supervising the implementation and observance of the laws and other legal acts passed by it. The highest executive body is the Oblast Government, which includes territorial executive bodies such as district administrations, committees, and commissions that facilitate development and run the day to day matters of the province. The Oblast administration supports the activities of the Governor who is the highest official and acts as guarantor of the observance of the oblast Charter in accordance with the Constitution of Russia.

Demographics
Population:

Settlements

2007
Birth Rate: 10.6 per 1000 in 2007
Death Rate: 16.8 per 1000 in 2007

2008
Births (2008): 15,906 (11.3 per 1000)
Deaths (2008): 24,081 (17.1 per 1000)

Vital statistics for 2012
Births: 16 907 (12.7 per 1000)
Deaths: 20 500 (15.5 per 1000) 
Total fertility rate:
2009 – 1.59 | 2010 – 1.59 | 2011 – 1.64 | 2012 – 1.81 | 2013 – 1.87 | 2014 – 1.89 | 2015 – 1.91 | 2016 – 1.94(e)

2010
Ethnic Composition (2010):
Russians – 91.9%
Tatars – 2.8%
Mari people – 2.3%
Udmurts – 1%
Ukrainians – 0.6%
Others – 1.4%
35,385 people were registered from administrative databases, and could not declare an ethnicity. It is estimated that the proportion of ethnicities in this group is the same as that of the declared group.

Religion

According to a 2012 survey 40.1% of the population of Kirov Oblast adheres to the Russian Orthodox Church, 5% are unaffiliated generic Christians, 1% are Orthodox Christian believers not belonging to churches or members of non-Russian Orthodox churches, 1% are adherents to Islam, 1% to the Old Believers. In addition, 33% of the population deems itself to be "spiritual but not religious", 13% is atheist, and 5.9% follows other religions or did not give an answer to the question.

See also
List of Chairmen of the Kirov Oblast Duma

References

Notes

Sources

"СССР. Административно-территориальное деление союзных республик. 1987." (USSR. Administrative-Territorial Structure of the Union Republics. 1987) / Составители В. А. Дударев, Н. А. Евсеева. – М.: Изд-во «Известия Советов народных депутатов СССР», 1987. – 673 с.

External links

 
States and territories established in 1936